The 1936–37 season was the 37th season of competitive football in Belgium. R Daring Club de Bruxelles won their 5th and last Premier Division title.

Overview
At the end of the season, FC Turnhout and RRC de Malines were relegated to Division I, while RC Tirlemont (Division I A winner) and OC Charleroi (Division I B winner) were promoted to the Premier Division.
Stade Waremmien, RRC de Bruxelles, AS Ostende and Hoboken SK were relegated from Promotion to Division I, to be replaced by R Charleroi SC, FC Wilrijck, R Vilvorde FC and AS Renaisienne.

National team

* Belgium score given first

Key
 H = Home match
 A = Away match
 N = On neutral ground
 F = Friendly
 o.g. = own goal

Honours

Final league tables

Premier Division

References
RSSSF archive – Final tables 1895–2002
Belgian clubs history
FA website